Chris Lowney (born 1958) is an American writer, public speaker, and leadership consultant. He is chair of the Board of CommonSpirit Health, the nation's largest nonprofit health system by revenue in 2022. He was formerly a managing director of J.P. Morgan.

Biography 
Born in New York City, Lowney attended Regis High School, a Jesuit institution in Manhattan, and then entered a Jesuit novitiate. He completed a B.A. in History and an M.A. in Philosophy at Fordham University (both in 1981) and was elected to Phi Beta Kappa. He left the Jesuit seminary in 1983 and worked at JP Morgan from 1983 to 2001. At Morgan, he was an investment banker to Fortune 1000 companies and, later, a managing director in Tokyo and Singapore, where he served on Morgan's Asia-Pacific management committee. Later, as a managing director in London, he served on Morgan's Europe, Mideast, and Africa management committee.

After leaving Morgan in 2001, Lowney authored six books and co-authored two more. He has delivered talks and conferences on leadership, decision-making, and business ethics throughout the U.S. and in Spain, France, Australia, Argentina, Uruguay, Colombia, Indonesia, and many other countries.

He is chair of the Board of CommonSpirit Health, the nation's largest nonprofit health system by revenue in 2022.

Lowney founded Pilgrimage for Our Children's Future, which funds education and healthcare projects in the developing world. He helped launch Jesuit Commons-Higher Education at the Margins, which offers university-level education in refugee camps. He conceived and co-founded Contemplative Leaders in Action, a young adult leadership formation program active in seven cities.

Personal life 
Lowney is Catholic.

Awards 
Lowney has been awarded honorary doctoral degrees by Gonzaga University, St. Louis University, the University of Scranton, the University of Great Falls, and Marymount Manhattan College, Chestnut Hill College,  Wheeling Jesuit University, and Fairfield University, and Albertus Magnus College.

He was named a miembro honorario del claustro at Peru's Universidad del Pacifico, was 2009 commencement speaker at the Ateneo de Manila University in the Philippines, and delivered the 2012 JRD Tata Oration at XLRI in India.

Publications 
Lowney writes a regular column on leadership for Forbes and for Aleteia. His other authored works include:
Heroic Leadership: Best Practices from a 450-Year-Old Company that Changed the World (Loyola Press, 2003); number-one ranked bestseller of the CBPA and has been translated into eleven languages. The book was named to the Reading List of the Commandant of the U.S. Marine Corps.
A Vanished World: Muslims, Christians, and Jews in Medieval Spain (Free Press, 2005; Oxford University Press, 2006); nominated for La Corónica award.
Heroic Living: Discover Your Purpose and Change the World (2010)
Pope Francis: Why He Leads the Way He Leads (2013)
Everyone Leads: How to Revitalize the Catholic Church (2017) The book won 2nd place in its category in the 2018 Catholic Press Association Awards
Make Today Matter: 10 Habits for a Better Life (and World) (2018) won a 2018 Independent Press Award as a Distinguished Favorite in the Inspiration category and a 2019 Independent Press Award for Self-Help: Spiritual. The book also won a Gold Medal in the 2019 Illumination Awards and Make Today Matter is a Finalist in the Self-Help: Motivational category of the 2019 International Book Awards.
Guide to the Camino Ignaciano, co-authored with Jose Luis  Iriberri, S.J. (2nd Edition, 2018, Cluny Media)
On the Ignatian Way, co-authored with Jose Luis Iriberri, S.J. (2018)

References

External links 
 website
 Pilgrimage for Our Children's Future

21st-century American economists
American philanthropists
1958 births
Living people
American male non-fiction writers
American Roman Catholics
Regis High School (New York City) alumni